The first season of the television series Stargate Atlantis commenced airing on the Sci Fi Channel in the United States on July 16, 2004, concluded on The Movie Network in Canada on January 31, 2005, and contained 20 episodes. The show was a spin off of sister show, Stargate SG-1. Stargate Atlantis re-introduced supporting characters from the SG-1 universe, such as Elizabeth Weir and Rodney McKay among others. The show also included new characters such as Teyla Emmagan and John Sheppard. The first season is about a military-science expedition team discovering Atlantis and exploring the Pegasus Galaxy. However, there is no way to return home, and they inadvertently wake a hostile alien race known as the Wraith, whose primary goal is to gather a fleet to invade Atlantis and find their new "feeding ground", Earth.

The two-hour premiere "Rising", which aired on July 16, 2004, received Sci Fi Channel's highest-ever rating for a series premiere and episode ever released, it is also the most watched broadcast release ever released by the Sci Fi Channel in the United States. The average viewing rate for the first ten episodes were around 3-4 million in the United States. The series was developed by Brad Wright and Robert C. Cooper, who also served as executive producers. Season one regular cast members included Joe Flanigan, Torri Higginson, Rachel Luttrell, Rainbow Sun Francks, and David Hewlett.

Cast
 Starring Joe Flanigan as Major John Sheppard
 Torri Higginson as Dr. Elizabeth Weir
 Rachel Luttrell as Teyla Emmagan
 With Rainbow Sun Francks as First Lieutenant Aiden Ford
 And David Hewlett as Dr. Rodney McKay

Episodes 

Episodes in bold are continuous episodes, where the story spans over 2 or more episodes.

Production

For "Rising", the Pemberton Glacier in British Columbia doubled for Antarctica during the opening flying sequence. Simon, Elizabeth's fiancé in "Rising" and "Home", was played by Garwin Sanford, who had previously played Narim on Stargate SG-1. Mario Azzopardi makes his return to the Stargate franchise in "Thirty-Eight Minutes".  He had the distinctive honor of directing the pilot episode of Stargate SG-1, "Children of the Gods."  This is his first time directing an episode of the franchise since the Season 1 Episode "Cor-Ai."  Mario Azzopardi (as of December 2006) has only directed Season 1 Episodes of both SG-1 and Atlantis. "Thirty-Eight Minutes" is the only episode in both SG-1 and Atlantis to actually occur in real-time; between the opening of the Stargate and the resolution, 38 minutes of screentime do occur. Courtenay J. Stevens, who appears in "Childhood's End", had originally played the role of Lieutenant Elliot in Stargate SG-1, appearing in the Season 5 episodes "Proving Ground", "Summit" and "Last Stand". Writer Martin Gero compared Ares in "Childhood's End" to a villain in The Incredibles.  In the scene of the final confrontation with Major John Sheppard, he began "monologuing," which is a key feature of villains in the film. The dog that appeared in Dr. Weir's illusion in "Home" is actually owned by actress Torri Higginson who plays her.

Michael Puttonen, who played Smeadon in "The Storm", first appeared in the second season of Stargate SG-1 as Simian, the blind prisoner in the episode "Prisoners." "The Defiant One" was filmed at the Richmond sand dunes. Richard Ian Cox, who appeared in "The Defiant One", previously appeared in the season 3 Stargate SG-1 episode "New Ground" as Nyan. "Letters from Pegasus" is the first clip show episode of Stargate Atlantis. The title of this episode was inspired by the 1987 PBS TV documentary Dear America: Letters Home from Vietnam. This was Samantha Carter's first appearance on Stargate Atlantis. At the end of the episode, she and Sergeant Harriman were briefly shown at Stargate Command (SGC) when they received the data burst from Atlantis. A deleted scene from Part two of "The Siege" showed Sora being returned to the Genii as part of their deal for the nuclear weapons, but this was cut due to time constraints; so it is unclear if the event occurred or if Sora may still be being held.

Release and reception 
"Rising" was the strongest episode to date gaining a 3.2 on the Nielsen ratings. "The Brotherhood" received ratings of 2.3 when it initially aired on Sci Fi. The worst rated episode in the season was "Home", which received a 1.7 rating. John Sinnott from DVDTalk called season one a "very good spinoff," certifying it "highly recommended." Dan Heaton from Digitally Obsessed was positive to the first season, and said the pilot started "in fashion." Reviewer Dan Phelps from DVDFanatic gave the series "thumbs up" and gave the series an A−. 

"Rising" was nominated for a Leo Award in the category "Dramatic Series: Best Production Design". "Childhood's End" was one of  only two Stargate franchise episodes (with "Poisoning the Well") directed by Sci-Fi veteran David Winning. It won three international awards for directing; New York, Chicago and Houston. For "Poisoning The Well", Paul McGillion and David Nykl were nominated for a Leo Award in the category "Dramatic Series: Best Supporting Performance by a Male", and Allison Hossack was nominated for a Leo Award in the category "Dramatic Series: Best Supporting Performance by a Female". "The Storm" was nominated for a Leo Award in the category "Dramatic Series: Best Overall Sound". "The Eye" was nominated for a Gemini Award in the category "Best Visual Effects", was nominated for a Leo Award in the category "Dramatic Series: Best Picture Editing", and won a Leo Award in the category "Dramatic Series: Best Visual Effects". For "The Defiant One", director Peter DeLuise was nominated for a Leo Award in the category "Dramatic Series: Best Direction" and in the category "Dramatic Series: Best Screenwriting". "Before I Sleep" was nominated for a Gemini Award in the category "Best Achievement in Make-Up". For "The Brotherhood", writer Martin Gero was nominated for a Gemini Award in the category "Best Writing in a Dramatic Series".

Cultural references 
"The Defiant One" is the first time Rodney McKay refers to John Sheppard as "Captain Kirk" which is a recurring joke in the series. It refers to Sheppard's protective nature to the puddle jumpers and his tendency to pick up alien women. In the continuing list of references in Stargate to The Wizard of Oz, McKay mentions in "Sanctuary" to "Pay no attention to the man behind the curtain", a reference to the Emerald Wizard of the story. He also compares Sheppard's actions with Chaya to Captain Kirk, continuing the links between Stargate and Star Trek.

References

External links

 Season 1 on GateWorld
 Season 1 on IMDb
 Season 1 on TV.com
 

.1
2004 American television seasons
2005 American television seasons
Atlantis 01
2004 Canadian television seasons
2005 Canadian television seasons